The badminton competitions at the 1991 Southeast Asian Games in Manila were held at Camp Crame Gymnasium in Quezon City, Metro Manila. The 1991 Games featured competitions in seven events (men 3 events, women 3 events, and mixed 1 event).

Medal summary

Medal table

Medalists

Men's team

Semi-final

Bronze medal match

Gold medal match

Women's team

Semi-final

Bronze medal match

Gold medal match

Men's singles

Women's singles

Men's doubles

Women's doubles

Mixed doubles

References

External links 
 Individual events at bwf.tournamentsoftware.com

1991
Southeast Asian Games
1991 Southeast Asian Games events
Badminton tournaments in the Philippines